Nassarius albescens, common name : the whitish nassa, is a species of sea snail, a marine gastropod mollusc in the family Nassariidae, the Nassa mud snails or dog whelks.

The subspecies :  Nassarius albescens gemmuliferus (A. Adams, 1852) is a synonym of Nassarius gemmuliferus (A. Adams, 1852) ) (synonyms : Nassa (Niotha) albescens var. fenestratus (Marrat, 1877); Nassa (Niotha) fenestrata (Marrat, 1877); Nassa fenestrata Marratt, 1877; Nassa gemmulifera A. Adams, 1852; Nassa isabellei Reeve, 1853; Nassarius (Niotha) albescens gemmuliferus (A. Adams, 1852); Nassarius (Niotha) fenestratus (Marrat, 1877); Nassarius (Niotha) fenestratus var. gestroi Bisacchi, 1930; Nassarius fenestratus (Marratt, 1877);

Description
The length of the shell varies between 9 mm and 25 mm. Its surface sculpture has a distinctive fine network of evenly spaced nodules. The columella is narrow or wide. The overall colour of the shell is creamy white while the aperture is brown.

Distribution
This species is distributed in the Indian Ocean off Madagascar and in the Pacific Ocean off the Philippines and Australia.

References

 Hombron, J.B. & Jacquinot, C.H. (1842-1854). Atlas d'histoire Naturelle zoologie par MM. Hombron et Jacquinot, chirurgiens de l'expédition. Voyage au Pole Sud et dans l'Océanie sur les corvettes l'Astrolabe et la Zélée éxecuté par ordre du roi pendant les années 1837–1838–1839–1840 sous le commandement de M. Dumont-d'Urville, capitaine de vaisseau, publié sous les auspices du département de la marine et sous la direction supérieure de M. Jacquinot, capitaine de vaisseau, commandant de la Zélée. Zoologie. Gide & Cie, Paris.
 Dautzenberg, Ph. (1929). Mollusques testacés marins de Madagascar. Faune des Colonies Francaises, Tome III
 Cernohorsky W. O. (1984). Systematics of the family Nassariidae (Mollusca: Gastropoda). Bulletin of the Auckland Institute and Museum 14: 1–356
 Wells, F. E. (1994). The invertebrate community of subtidal sand habitats at Cape d' Aguilar, Hong Kong, with an emphasis on molluscs. In: Proceedings of the Third International workshop on the malacofauna of Hong Kong and Southern China (Eds. Motrton, B.). The malacofauna of Hong Kong and southern China III, pp467-477. Hong Kong University Press, Hong Kong.
 Branch, G.M. et al. (2002). Two Oceans. 5th impression. David Philip, Cate Town & Johannesburg
 Liu, J.Y. [Ruiyu] (ed.). (2008). Checklist of marine biota of China seas. China Science Press. 1267 pp.

External links
 Adams, A. (1852-1853). Catalogue of the species of Nassa, a genus of gasteropodous Mollusca belonging to the family Buccinidae, in the collection of Hugh Cuming, Esq., with the description of some new species. Proceedings of the Zoological Society of London. (1851) 19: 94-112
 

Nassariidae
Gastropods described in 1846